The boys' ski jumping event at the 2020 Winter Youth  Olympics was held on 19 January at the Les Tuffes Nordic Centre.

Results
The first round was started at 14:00 and the final round at 15:20.

References

 

Boys' individual